Simon Ooi Tze Min (born 2 July 1984),  better known as Simon Ooi, is a Malaysian politician who has served as the Political Secretary to the Minister of Science, Technology and Innovation Chang Lih Kang since December 2022 or January 2023. He has twice served as a Member of the Kedah State Legislative Assembly for Bakar Arang state constituency since May 2013. He is a member of the People’s Justice Party (PKR), a component party of the Pakatan Harapan (PH) opposition coalition. After Pakatan Harapan won in the 14th General Election, he also served as a Member of the Kedah State Executive Council (EXCO) from May 2018 to May 2020. Currently, he holds several positions in PKR, as a Central Leadership Council Member (MPP), Vice Chairman of Kedah state, and also Chairman of Sungai Petani division.

General Introduction 

Ooi Tze Min (simplified Chinese: 黄思敏; born 2 July 1984),  better known as Simon Ooi, is a Malaysian politician who has twice served as a Member of the Kedah State Legislative Assembly for Bakar Arang state constituency since May 2013. He is a member of the People’s Justice Party (PKR), a component party of the Pakatan Harapan (PH) opposition coalition. After Pakatan Harapan won in the 14th General Election, he also served as a Member of the Kedah State Executive Council (EXCO) from May 2018 to May 2020. Currently, he holds several positions in PKR, as a Central Leadership Council Member (MPP), Vice Chairman of Kedah state, and also Chairman of Sungai Petani division.

Educational Background 

Simon received his primary education in SJKC Chung Hwa Sungai Lalang. He then continued his secondary education in SMK Amanjaya. Subsequently after completing secondary school, he furthered his academic education in University of Putra Malaysia (UPM) and obtained his first Bachelor Degree of Computer and Communication System Engineering in 2008. In 2014, he started to pursue his second Bachelor Degree of Jurisprudence in University of Malaya (UM). In the next few years, he had been travelling back and forth between Sungai Petani and Kuala Lumpur weekly to attend lectures in the university. Once, he was forced to defer his study after being appointed as a Member of Kedah State Executive Council in 2018. After the PH government was overthrown, he resumed his study in 2020 and eventually completed the degree in July 2021.

Political career

Student Activist 

Simon had been actively involved in student activism during his university time. In 2006, he served as the Vice President of Chinese Language Society of UPM and Coordinator of Student Progressive Front UPM. He then became the Administrative Secretary of Malaysia Youth and Student Democratic Movement (DEMA) in 2007. His most significant chapter as a student activist was initiating a protest and boycott movement against unfair campus election in 2005 through a series of peaceful assemblies in UPM. As a consequence, he was charged by the university authorities for 7 charges under the University and University College Act 1971 (AUKU).

Earlier Involvement in Politics 

Simon kickstarted his journey in politics by joining People’s Justice Party (PKR) in 2008. He debuted as political secretary to Member of Parliament Gopeng, Dr Lee Boon Chye from 2008 to 2009. In 2010, he returned to his hometown, Sungai Petani, Kedah and served as a Municipal Councillor in Sungai Petani Municipal Council until 2013 before he was elected as State Assemblyperson in the 13th General Election.

Kedah State Assemblyperson 

In the 13th General Election held on 5 May 2013, it was the first time Simon contested in an election and was elected as the State Assemblyperson of Bakar Arang Constituency in Kedah. The seat was retained by him with a larger majority in the 14th General Election held on 9 May 2018. At the same time, Pakatan Harapan coalition was installed as State Government in Kedah after winning with a majority of 18 out of 36 state seats.

Member of Kedah State Executive Council 

After the Pakatan Harapan coalition became State Government in the 14th General Election, Simon was appointed as a Member of Kedah State Executive Council (EXCO), being the only Chinese representative from PKR. During his service, he held the portfolios of Environment, Science and Technology; as well as Chinese and Siamese Community Affairs. Two years later, the PH State Government in Kedah was overthrown where Simon signed off his duty as an EXCO and returned to the opposition seat.

People’s Justice Party 

Prior to 2018, Simon held the position of Deputy Chairperson for PKR Youth Wing (Angkatan Muda Keadilan) in Kedah state. After the Party Elections in 2018, Simon was appointed as the treasurer of the Central Youth Wing and Vice Chairperson of the party in Kedah State. In 2022, he contested in the Keadilan Party Elections or known as Pemilihan Keadilan 2022, he wrestled against one of the pioneer members in the party, Dato’ Johari Abdul and won the position Chairperson in Sungai Petani Division. Whereas in the central level, Simon contested for the position of Central Leadership Council Member alongside with 73 other candidates and was elected after securing 703 votes, making him to the Top 20 for the position. He was also continually appointed as the Vice Chairperson of PKR in Kedah state.

Election results

References 

Living people
People from Kedah
Malaysian people of Chinese descent
People's Justice Party (Malaysia) politicians
21st-century Malaysian politicians
Members of the Kedah State Legislative Assembly
Kedah state executive councillors
1984 births